Germantown Hills is a village in Woodford County, Illinois, approximately  northeast of Peoria. Germantown Hills is the only incorporated community in Worth Township.  As of the 2010 census, the village had a total population of 3,438. Largely an agricultural community until its incorporation in 1954, Germantown Hills is now a growing bedroom community in the Peoria Metropolitan Area.

History
Settlement of the area began as early as November 1831, when Methodist Rev. Zadock Hall began preaching in modern-day Worth Township.  Soon after, an iron foundry was opened by settler Philip Klein.  By 1837, a Catholic church was organized by German Catholics in the area.  In 1850, William Hoshor built a tavern and hotel named the Germantown House, for which the village would be named more than 100 years later.  A steam sawmill was built in 1860, and in the 1890s, the Union House was erected as a tavern, grocery store, and saloon.

The area remained almost completely agricultural until the incorporation of Oak Grove Park in 1954.  The village's founders wished to use the name "Germantown" to reflect Hoshor's Germantown House and the area's large German-American representation, but the name was taken by a village in southern Illinois.  Upon its incorporation, the population of Oak Grove Park was 182.  In 1967, the name Oak Grove Park was dropped in favor of Germantown Hills.  The village's population would rise steadily until the 1980 census, when the annexation of the Whispering Oaks subdivision brought the number to 524.  Subsequent development and annexation brought the population to 1195 by 1990.  Rampant development, fueled by suburbanization in the Peoria Metropolitan Area, brought the population to its most-recent count of 3,438.

Geography
Germantown Hills is located at  (40.771569, -89.461894).

 Illinois State Route 116, a four-lane divided highway, runs through the center of the village and connects it to Peoria, serving as the focal point for development and residences.

Demographics

As of the census of 2010, there were 3,438 people (up from about 2,100 recorded in the 2000 census), 1,175 households, and 975 families residing in the village. The racial makeup of the village was 96.0% White, 0.5% African American, 1.8% Asian, 0.3% from other races, and 1.3% representing two or more races. Hispanic or Latino of any race represented 1.8% of the population.

There were 1,175 households, out of which 45.1% had children under the age of 18 living with them, 73.1% were married couples living together, 6.6% had a female householder with no husband present, and 17.0% were non-families. 14.8% of all households were made up of individuals, and 3.9% had someone living alone who was 65 years of age or older. The average household size was 2.93 and the average family size was 3.26.

In the village, the population was spread out, with 33.6% under the age of 20, 4.2% from 20 to 24, 26.9% from 25 to 44, 28.8% from 45 to 64, and 6.5% who were 65 years of age or older. The median age was 35.8 years. For every 100 females, there were 100.4 males. For every 100 females age 20 and over, there were 95.9 males.

According to the 2005-2009 American Community Survey, the median income for a household in the village was $99,196, and the median income for a family was $105,792. The per capita income for the village was $36,651.  About 1.7% of families and 2.2% of the population were below the poverty line, including 3.6% of those under age 18 and 4.0% of those age 65 or over.

Education
 Germantown Hills School District 69 comprises two schools:
 Germantown Hills Elementary School is responsible for Kindergarten to Grade 2. In 2008, 314 students were enrolled.
 Germantown Hills Middle School educates students in Grades 3 through 8. The school's 2008 enrollment was 612  In 2008, GHMS was ranked 15 out of the 1357 middle schools in Illinois by results of the Illinois Standards Achievement Test (ISAT).
 Metamora Township High School District 122 encompasses Germantown Hills, responsible for Grades 9 through 12.  The village's high school students attend Metamora Township High School in neighboring Metamora.

References

External links
 Village of Germantown Hills public Website
 Village of Germantown Hills Government Website

Villages in Illinois
Villages in Woodford County, Illinois
Peoria metropolitan area, Illinois
Populated places established in 1831